The 2017 ITS Cup was a professional tennis tournament played on outdoor clay courts. It was the ninth edition of the tournament and was part of the 2017 ITF Women's Circuit. It took place in Olomouc, Czech Republic, on 17–23 July 2017.

Singles main draw entrants

Seeds 

 1 Rankings as of 3 July 2017.

Other entrants 
The following players received a wildcard into the singles main draw:
  Marie Benoît
  Miriam Kolodziejová
  Anastasia Pribylova
  Anna Sisková

The following player received entry by a special exempt:
  Anastasia Zarycká

The following players received entry from the qualifying draw:
  Nina Potočnik
  Sabrina Santamaria
  Raluca Georgiana Șerban
  Vendula Žovincová

Champions

Singles

  Bernarda Pera def.  Kristýna Plíšková, 7–5, 4–6, 6–3

Doubles

  Amandine Hesse /  Victoria Rodríguez def.  Michaela Hončová /  Raluca Georgiana Șerban, 3–6, 6–2, [10–6]

External links 
 2017 ITS Cup at ITFtennis.com
 Official website

2017 ITF Women's Circuit
2017 in Czech women's sport
ITS Cup
2017 in Czech tennis